Qamaruzzaman, Kamar al-Zaman or Kamar es-Saman() is a name based in middle Asia, and may lead to:

People
 A. H. M. Qamaruzzaman
 Qamaruzzaman Azmi (born 1946)
 Muhammad Kamaruzzaman (1952–2015)
 Qamar Zaman (born 1952)
 Qamar Zaman Kaira (born 1960)
 Syed Qamar Zaman Shah
 Qamar Zaman Chaudhry (born 1960)
 Qamar-uz-Zaman Chaudhry

Other
 Kamaralzaman or Camaralzaman, a fictional character in the book One Thousand and One Nights